Spielmann or Spielman is a German occupational surname, which means "jester", from the Middle High German spilære. The name may refer to:

Amanda Spielman (born 1961), British Chief Inspector of Schools
Andrew Spielman (1930–2006), American medical researcher
Chris Spielman (born 1965), American football player
Christian Spielmann (born 1963), German physicist
Dan Spielman (born 1979), Australian actor
Daniel Spielman (born 1970), American computer scientist
David Spielman (born 1950), American photographer
Dean Spielmann (born 1962), Luxembourg judge
Francisc Spielmann (1916–1974), Romanian footballer
Götz Spielmann (born 1961), Austrian film director
Isidore Spielmann (1854-1922), British engineer & art-connoisseur
Lori Nelson Spielman (born 1961), American author 
Marion Harry Spielmann (1858–1948), British art critic
Peter James Spielmann (born 1952), American journalist
Rick Spielman (born 1962), American football manager
Rudolf Spielmann (1883–1942), Austrian chess player

See also
Spielman, Maryland
Max Spielmann, a division of UK retailer Timpson

References

German-language surnames
Jewish surnames
Occupational surnames
German words and phrases